James Stewart Youel (February 13, 1922 – April 9, 2020) was an American football quarterback in the National Football League for the Washington Redskins and Boston Yanks. Born in Vinton, Iowa, he played college football at the University of Iowa.

Early life
Youel was born in Vinton, Iowa and attended Fort Madison High School, where he participated in football, basketball, and track.  His mother was originally hesitant to let him play football because she had lost a brother to a broken neck while he played football.

College career
Youel attended and played college football at the University of Iowa as a quarterback and punter.  In 1942 he helped the Hawkeyes defeat the previously unbeaten Wisconsin Badgers, 6–0.  During the game, he had four punts of 50+ yards, which helped stall the Wisconsin offense.  After the 1942 season, Youel was chosen to play in the Chicago College All-Star Game, and the All-Stars beat the Washington Redskins 27–7. In 1943 Youel graduated with a degree in mechanical engineering.

Navy
After graduating from college, Youel enlisted in the United States Navy during World War II.  While stationed at Naval Station Great Lakes, he played football and was a boxer.

Professional career
After finishing his service with the Navy, Youel was signed by Cleveland Rams in January 1945.  However, he was traded to the Washington Redskins for guard Al Fiorentino before ever playing with the Rams.  In 1946 and 1947 with the Redskins, he served as the backup quarterback for Sammy Baugh.

1948
On June 1, 1948, Youel was traded, along with end Joe Duckworth, to the Boston Yanks for offensive tackle Tom Dean.  He started only one game for the Yanks (in early October) and was then waived, after which he was signed by the Detroit Lions.  Youel misunderstood the signing, however, and accidentally reported to the Philadelphia Eagles, and missed the October 24th game against the Los Angeles Rams.  He then took a train to Detroit where he was informed that he had been sent to the Rams.  Youel never played for the Rams, however, and was sent back to the Washington Redskins for the end of the 1948 season.

Personal life
After Youel retired from the NFL, he became a math teacher and football coach for his alma mater, Fort Madison High School.  In 2008 Fort Madison renamed their football field "Jim Youel Field" in his honor. Youel was named to the Iowa Football Coaches Association Hall of Fame.

He died on April 9, 2020, in Traer, Iowa at age 98.

References

External links
 

1922 births
2020 deaths
American football quarterbacks
Boston Yanks players
Great Lakes Navy Bluejackets football players
Iowa Hawkeyes football players
Washington Redskins players
United States Navy personnel of World War II
Sportspeople from Cedar Rapids, Iowa
People from Vinton, Iowa
Military personnel from Iowa
Players of American football from Iowa
American sportsmen
United States Navy sailors